The Belmont Oaks Invitational Stakes is an American Thoroughbred horse race held annually in early July at Belmont Park in Elmont, New York. A Grade I event open to three-year-old fillies, it is raced on turf over a distance of a mile and a quarter (10 furlongs). The purse was increased to $1,000,000 in 2014. The race is a Breeders' Cup Challenge "Win and You're In" event for the Filly and Mare Turf.

The Belmont Oaks became a Grade I race in 1999. It was previously known as the Garden City Stakes from 2007 to 2013 when it was run in September at  miles. From 1996–2006, it was called the Garden City Breeders' Cup, and the Rare Perfume before that. The latter name was in honor of George Widener's racing mare, Rare Perfume. The Garden City name referred to Garden City, New York, a village in the Town of Hempstead in central Nassau County located near the racetrack.

Records
Speed  record: (at current distance of  miles)
 1:58.71 – Athena (2018)

Most wins by an owner:
 3 – Tabor, Magnier & Derrick Smith (2014, 2018, 2021)
 2 – Ogden Phipps (1981, 1987)
 2 – John W. Phillips (2002, 2011)

Most wins by a jockey:
 4 – José A. Santos (1989, 1990, 1991, 2004)

Most wins by a trainer:
 5 – Chad C. Brown (2012–2015, 2017)
 3 – H. Allen Jerkens (1988, 1992, 1993)

Winners

References

Graded stakes races in the United States
Flat horse races for three-year-old fillies
Grade 1 stakes races in the United States
Horse races in New York (state)
Turf races in the United States
Belmont Park
Recurring sporting events established in 1978
1978 establishments in New York (state)
Breeders' Cup Challenge series